Hercules, or Her, is a dwarf spheroidal galaxy situated in the Hercules constellation and discovered in 2006 in data obtained by the Sloan Digital Sky Survey. The galaxy is located at a distance of about 140 kpc from the Sun and moves away from the Sun with a velocity of about 45 km/s. It is classified as a dwarf spheroidal galaxy (dSph). It  has a noticeably elongated (ratio of axes ~ 3:1) shape with a half-light radius of about 350 pc. This elongation may be caused by tidal forces acting from the Milky Way galaxy, meaning that Her is being tidally disrupted now. Her also shows some gradient of velocities across the galaxy's body and is embedded into a faint stellar stream, which also points towards its ongoing tidal disruption.

Her is one of the smallest and faintest satellites of the Milky Way—its integrated luminosity is about 30,000 times that of the Sun (absolute visible magnitude of about −6.6), which is comparable to the luminosity of a typical globular cluster. However, its total mass is about 7 million solar masses, which means the galaxy's mass to light ratio is around 330. A high mass to light ratio implies that Her is dominated by dark matter.

The stellar population of Her consists mainly of old stars formed more than 12 billion years ago. The stars of Her  were probably among the first stars to form in the Universe. Currently there is no star formation in Her. Measurements have so far failed to detect neutral hydrogen in it—the upper limit is 466 solar masses.

Notes

References

Dwarf spheroidal galaxies
4713560
Hercules (constellation)
Local Group
Milky Way Subgroup
?